Roberto Carlos Ávalos Pino (born 16 June 1980) is a former Chilean footballer who played as midfielder.

External links
 Roberto Ávalos at Football-Lineups
 
 

1980 births
Living people
Chilean footballers
Club Deportivo Palestino footballers
Chilean Primera División players
Association football midfielders